Alfred Edward Gaby, VC (25 January 1892 – 11 August 1918) was an Australian recipient of the Victoria Cross, the highest award for gallantry in the face of the enemy that can be awarded to British and Commonwealth forces.

Born in Tasmania, Gaby worked as a farmer and then a labourer before enlisting in the Australian Imperial Force in 1916 and volunteering to serve overseas. Serving initially in the ranks, Gaby was quickly promoted, having previously served as a part-time soldier before the war, and was commissioned in 1917. He was one of 64 Australians to receive the award for their actions during the First World War, receiving it for his actions during an attack around Villers-Bretonneux in France during the Battle of Amiens that took place at the start of the Allied Hundred Days Offensive. He was killed three days later, at the age of 26, while leading another attack around Lihons.

Early life
Born in Springfield near Ringarooma, Tasmania, he was the seventh son of Alfred Gaby, a farmer, and his wife Adelaide, née Whiteway. While working on the family farm, he joined the militia and served for three years with the 12th Infantry Battalion (Launceston Regiment). Two of his brothers had served overseas during the Second Boer War.

Military service
Gaby was labouring in Katanning, Western Australia, when he enlisted in the Australian Imperial Force (AIF) in January 1916. He had been twice previously rejected for enlistment. He embarked from Fremantle on board HMAT A38 Ulysses in April 1916, and was assigned to the 28th Battalion – an infantry battalion that was formed mainly from Western Australian recruits, which was assigned to the 7th Brigade, 2nd Division – as part of the unit's tenth draft of reinforcements. Over the course of the next twelve months while in the frontline on the Western Front, he was promoted through the ranks at a rapid speed, reaching sergeant before being selected for officer training in the United Kingdom. He was commissioned as a second lieutenant in April 1917 and graduated from the course in May. Further promotion came in September when he made lieutenant. On 29 October, Gaby was gassed during the 28th Battalion's involvement in the Battle of Passchendaele.

Victoria Cross details

Gaby was 26 years old lieutenant when the following deed took place for which he was awarded the Victoria Cross (VC). On 8 August 1918, at the start of the Allied Hundred Days Offensive, Gaby was acting as commander of his battalion's 'D' Company, which was committed to an attack around Villers-Bretonneux, France, during the Battle of Amiens. When the advance was checked by a large German force about 40 yards beyond the wire, Gaby found a gap and approached the strong point under heavy machine-gun and rifle fire. He emptied his revolver into the garrison, drove the crews from their guns and captured 50 prisoners and four machine-guns. Three days later, on 11 August 1918 while leading his men during an attack at Lihons, he was killed.

His VC citation from the London Gazette of 30 October 1918 reads:

He is buried at the Heath Cemetery in Harbonnieres, France. He was unmarried at the time of his death. The Alfred Gaby ward at the former Repatriation General Hospital, Hollywood was named in his honour.

References

1892 births
1918 deaths
Australian Army officers
Australian military personnel killed in World War I
Australian World War I recipients of the Victoria Cross
People from Tasmania
Ringarooma
Military personnel from Tasmania
Burials at Heath Cemetery, Harbonnieres